The Carnegie Library in Danville, Kentucky is a building at Centre College. Built in 1913 as a Carnegie library, it served as the college library until 1967. The building was listed on the National Register of Historic Places in 1986.

References

Library buildings completed in 1913
Libraries on the National Register of Historic Places in Kentucky
Neoclassical architecture in Kentucky
1913 establishments in Kentucky
Centre College
National Register of Historic Places in Danville, Kentucky
University and college buildings on the National Register of Historic Places in Kentucky
University and college academic libraries in the United States